Peggy on a Spree or Peggy on the Loose (Swedish: Peggy på vift) is a 1946 Swedish comedy film directed by Arne Mattsson and starring Marguerite Viby, Gunnar Björnstrand and Stig Järrel. The film's sets were designed by the art director Bertil Duroj.

Synopsis
Frank Bing, a famous singer originally from Småland, returns to Sweden from America via Stockholm's Bromma Airport.

Cast
 Marguerite Viby as 	Peggy Dalin
 Gunnar Björnstrand as 	Harald Haraldsson
 Stig Järrel as	Frank Bing
 Julia Cæsar as Ada
 John Elfström as 	Hall Porter
 Lasse Krantz as 	Director
 Gunnel Broström as 	Bibbi Berling
 Börje Mellvig as 	Gustaf
 Erik Berglund as 	Dalin

References

Bibliography 
 Qvist, Per Olov & Von Bagh, Peter . Guide to the Cinema of Sweden and Finland. Greenwood Publishing Group, 2000.
 Wallengren, Ann-Kristin.  Welcome Home Mr Swanson: Swedish Emigrants and Swedishness on Film. Nordic Academic Press, 2014.

External links 
 

1946 films
Swedish comedy films
1946 comedy films
1940s Swedish-language films
Films directed by Arne Mattsson
Films set in Stockholm
1940s Swedish films